West Grinstead is a village and civil parish in the Horsham District of West Sussex, England. It lies just off the B2135 road four miles (6.3 km) northwest from Henfield. It is within the ancient division of the Rape of Bramber.

The western River Adur flows through the village.

The parish of West Grinstead covers an area of 2584 hectares (6382 acres)and consists of the villages of West Grinstead, Littleworth, Partridge Green and Dial Post. In the 2001 census 2934 people lived in 1099 households, of whom 1547 were economically active. At the 2011 Census the population was 3,054

The village should not be confused with the much larger town of East Grinstead which lies 17.5 miles (28 km) to the north-east.

Churches

The Shrine of Our Lady of Consolation dates from 1876 and is the Roman Catholic parish church. It is an important centre of Catholic pilgrimage in England. Two notable figures are buried in its grounds: Anglo-French writer and poet Hilaire Belloc (friend of fellow Catholic, G. K. Chesterton) and English writer Antonia White.

St George's Church was first built circa 1100 AD and is the Anglican place of worship, and the Church of England parish church.

History

Knepp Castle is located to the west of the village near the A24. It was a motte castle and founded in the 12th century by William de Braose. Some remains of the keep still stand.

The modern Knepp Castle nearby is a castellated mansion by John Nash.

Leisure
The Downs Link long-distance path runs through the parish and can be used for walking or cycling.

References

Horsham District
Villages in West Sussex